SABC NEWS is both a South African 24-hour news channel owned by the South African Broadcasting Corporation as well as the name of the news division of the broadcaster.

History
The News Service was established in June 1950, replacing the programmes of the BBC. Although this was because the BBC broadcasts were seen as giving a British viewpoint of current affairs, there were also concerns that the SABC service would become overly pro-government, or "Our Master's Voice".  By 1968, it had over 100 full-time reporters in the main cities and local correspondents all over the country, with overseas news provided by Reuters, AFP, AP and UPI. There was a News Film Unit which, prior to television in 1976, produced films for news agencies and television organisations.

In 1998, the SABC began to broadcast two TV channels to the rest of Africa: SABC Africa, a news service, and Africa 2 Africa, entertainment programming from South Africa and other African countries, via DStv. In 2003, Africa 2 Africa was merged with SABC Africa to create a hybrid service, drawing programming from both sources. SABC Africa closed in August 2008 after the SABC's contract with DStv was not renewed. In 2007, the SABC launched a 24-hour international news channel, SABC News International, but closed in 2010.
In 2017 SABC announced that they would launch two new channels on DStv as part of a deal with Multichoice to add a news service and a general entertainment channel, SABC News and SABC Encore.

Current television series
 Cutting Edge, Current affairs in ZesiNDEBELE, siSWATI, IsiXhosa and IsiZulu on SABC 1
 The Agenda, Weekdays 9am-12noon & Weekends 10am-12h30pm on the SABC NEWS CHANNEL
 Prime News On 3, Weekdays @ 8pm & Weekends @ 6pm on SABC 3 (S3)
 It's Topical, Sundays at 8pm on the SABC NEWS CHANNEL & Tuesdays @ 8h30pm on SABC 3 (S3)
 The Watchdog, Weeknights at 8-9pm on the SABC NEWS CHANNEL
 Fokus, an Afrikaans Show, Wednesdays @ 7pm on SABC 2
 On Point, Weekdays at 12noon-3pm on SABC 3 (S3) and the SABC NEWS CHANNEL
 SA Today, Weekdays @ 3pm-5pm & Weekends @ 2pm-5pm on the SABC NEWS CHANNEL
 Leihlo la Sechaba, Current affairs newsmagazine in Sotho, Setswana and Sepedi on SABC 2
 Zwa Maramani, Current affairs in Venda on SABC 2
 Vital Signs, Health Show in English on SABC 2 & the SABC NEWS CHANNEL
 Media & Society, in English, Sundays @ 9am on the SABC NEWS CHANNEL 
 Ngula Ya Vutivi, Current affairs in xiTsonga on SABC 2
 Yilungelo Lakho, multilingual consumer affairs series on SABC 1
 Full View, Current affairs in English, Monday-Sunday @ 5-8pm on the SABC NEWS CHANNEL
 Expressions, Current affairs in English focuses especially in youth on SABC 1
 Unfiltered, Current affairs focuses in govt & politics on SABC 3 (S3)
 The Globe, News from around the world, Monday-Sunday Nights @ 21h00-00h00 on the SABC NEWS CHANNEL
 Morning Live, Breakfast Show with news, markets, traffic, weather, sports & headlines, Weekdays @ 6-9am & Weekends @ 7-8h30am on SABC 2, & Monday-Sunday @ 6-9am on the SABC NEWS CHANNEL
 SPORTS Live, Saturdays @ 8h00pm on the SABC NEWS CHANNEL
 TrendZ live, Saturdays @ 8h30pm on the SABC NEWS CHANNEL
 Week In Review, Saturdays @ 1pm on the SABC NEWS CHANNEL
 The Week Ahead, Sundays @ 1pm on the SABC NEWS CHANNEL
 Stories Untold, Saturdays @ 12h30pm on the SABC NEWS CHANNEL
 Network, a Technology Show, Sundays @ 12h30pm on the SABC NEWS CHANNEL

References

External links

Television news in South Africa